Modoc High School (MHS) is a small high school located in Alturas, California. It is one of two high schools located in Modoc County, California.

In 1994, Modoc High School was awarded the California Distinguished School award.

Notable alumni 
Kayte Christensen, color commentator and former professional basketball player

Ray Privette,
1978/79 track relay record holder

References

External links 
 - Official Site
 - Northern Section California Interscholastic Federation Official Site

Schools in Modoc County, California
Alturas, California
Public high schools in California
Educational institutions in the United States with year of establishment missing